is a Japanese singer-songwriter, signed on Avex Group's J-More label.

She is known for singing the theme song for the video game Final Fantasy XIII-2, Yakusoku no Basho. She was nominated for Best New Artist at the 50th Japan Record Awards.

Discography

Albums
 My Song for You (2009)
 Lucky Charm (2010)

Mini-Albums
 Beautiful Days (2011)
 Another me (2014) (with Aimer)

Singles
 Ai no Uta (2008)
 Lucky (2008)
 Can Can/Promise You (2009)
 Ikutabi No Sakura (2011)
 Yakusoku No Basho/Tatta Hitori No Mikata (2011)''

References

External links
  

Japanese women singer-songwriters
Japanese singer-songwriters
Living people
People from Kyoto
1984 births
Musicians from Kyoto Prefecture
21st-century Japanese singers
21st-century Japanese women singers